Banaili Raj also known as Garhbanaili Raj was a zamindari estate based in the Indian state of Bihar. They were considered one of the ruling dynasties of the Mithila region.
Rulers and holders of this estate were Maithil Brahmin.

The name of the estate derives from a village Banaili in the then Purnia district of Bihar.

The main centres of residences of Rajas of Banaili are Banaili, Ramnagar, Champanagar, Srinagar, Garh Banaili, and Sultanganj. Bhagalpur was the centre from where administration of the estate was carried out.

One of the centres of Banaili Raj located in Sultanganj is believed to have ancient historical or mythical association. The Krishnagarh Palace built by Kumar Krishnanand Singh on Sultanganj is in the Karnagarh area, which is believed to be place where the Castle of King Karna of Mahabharata was located.

Raja Bahadur Dular Singh Choudhary
Though the roots of the family can be traced to 11th-12th centuries as done ably by Girijanand Sinha in his book, Banaili – Roots to Raj, the family achieved its famed eminence only in the 19th century during the reign of Raja Bahadur Dular Singh Chowdhry. It was Raja Dular Singh who fixed the family residence at Banaili and gave the family its current name. He was an enterprising Raja and added to the family's wealth using the opportunities afforded by the Permanent Settlement implemented by Lord Charles Cornwallis, 1st Marquess Cornwallis in the then state of Bengal. He received the title of Raja Bahadur from the British Government for his services during the Anglo-Nepalese War. Raja Dular Singh died in 1821.

Raja Bahadur Kalanand Sinha

Raja Kalanand Singh is listed in the official directory of the Coronation Durbar of 1911 as one of those attending the ceremonies.

Raja Bahadur Kirtyanand Sinha

The more prominent and better educated son of Raja Lilanand Singh was Raja Bahadur Kirtyanand Sinha. He was a Bachelor of Arts from the University of Allahabad, and was famous for his many pursuits – shikaar (hunting), Polo – as well for the role he played in the contemporary public life. He wrote three books – Purnea, a Shikarland; Shikar in Hills and Jungles; and Homeopathic Practice.

He and his brother made a contribution to the establishment of T.N.B College in Bhagalpur which was in need of funds having been established in 1880s. The Raja made a contribution of "60 acres of land and 600,000 of rupees in Cash for the construction of building and other developmental work". For this contribution and other acts of charity, he was awarded the title of "Raja" in June 1914.
On 9 July 1917, he was appointed as a government nominee to the Champaran Agrarian Committee which had been set up to resolve the issue of indigo planters in Champaran following the Champaran Satyagraha by Mahatma Gandhi. In this committee, he worked with Mahatma Gandhi, and for his work in the Committee he was awarded the title of "Raja Bahadur" in 1919.

On the request and appeal made by Sri Braj Mohan Thakur, Raja Bahadur Krityanand Singh along with Raja Tank Nath Choudhary created separately a chair of Maithili in Calcutta University. This went a long way in advancing maithili as a language.

He was one of the founders of the Bank of Bihar, which later merged with The State Bank of India. He was also an active Founder-member of Bihar State Cooperative Bank Limited. He also started a Banaili Iron and Steel Works in Sitarampur in Asansol, referred to in the book on Indian Economy written by eminent historian Amiya Kumar Bagchi and also in a book Bihar published by the National Book Trust. This venture, unfortunately, as the noted historian Amiya Kumar Bagchi observes, did not survive the "Great Depression".

The Raja, along with Maharaja of Darbhanga Maharaja of Darbhanga#cite note-56, hosted the first flight expedition over the Mount Everest in 1933 Maharaja of Darbhanga#cite note-56. "The Raja of Banaili, a cheery personality, who had shot over hundred tigers, offered us his fleet of motor-cars, remarking that, if possible, he would like to retain one or two of his own. He had seventeen. He seemed astonished, as if at an unusual display of moderation, when only three cars and a lorry were required." (Quoted in Everest – The Mountaineering History by Walt Unsworth from First Over Everest, The Houston-Mount Everest Expedition 1993 by Air Commodore PFM Fellowes et al.).

The Raja is credited for issuing the first official state invitation to the great maestro duo of Ustad Salamat & Nazakat Ali Khan of the Sham Chaurasia gharana in 1934. Ustad Salamat Ali Khan was then 11 years old and Nazakat Ali Khan 13 years. They were invited to perform at the Dussehra festival in Champanagar Deorhi (Palace) and the royal host liked their rendition of Malkauns so much that he would not let them leave Champanagr. The duo stayed under the patronage of the Raja for a few months, and some believe that their Basant Bahar composition "Des des ki thi jung dushman sab har gaye" is in the praise of the Raja.

Another great musician, Ustad Altaf Hussain Khan of Khurja, served as a court musician in the darbar of the Raja. Ustad Altaf Hussain Khan also gave music lessons to Raja's eldest son, Rajkumar Shyamanand Sinha.

Raja Bahadur Kirtyanand Sinha stayed in public life until his death in 1938. His place of residence remained the Champanagar Deorhi in Purnia inherited from his father. This Deorhi has remained the most enduring of the deorhis of Banaili Raj and to this day is inhabited by the descendants of the Raja.

See also
Zamindars of Bihar

References

Further reading

Reference to Forest of Munger owned by Raja of Banaili
Another reference in All India Reporter 1926
Reference to Raja Kirtyanand Singh in the Minutes of the Champaran Committee of Gandhi
Reference to a case involving Rani Prabhavati Devi in Supreme Court of India
Reference to famous Hindi novelist Saratchandra having worked in the Banaili estate
Reference to Ustad Vishmadev Chattopadyay as a Guru of Rajkumar Shyamanand Sinha

Mithila
Culture of Mithila
Palaces in Bihar
Purnia district
Zamindari estates